The following is a list notable New Zealand netball international players who have represented the national team in international tournaments such as the Commonwealth Games, the Netball World Cup, the World Games, the Taini Jamison Trophy, the Constellation Cup, the Netball Quad Series and in other senior test matches.

Current squad

First Test
On 20 August 1938, New Zealand made their test debut in an away match against at Australia at Royal Park, Melbourne. Australia defeated New Zealand 40–11. This was the first netball Test between Australia and New Zealand. It was also the world's first international netball match. The following New Zealand netball internationals played in this first test.

First home test
On 20 August 1948, New Zealand hosted their first home test against Australia at Forbury Park. Australia defeated New Zealand 27–16. The following New Zealand netball internationals played in this first home test.

Captains

Most-capped internationals

Centurions

70+ Appearances

New Zealand Sports Hall of Fame
The following New Zealand netball internationals have been inducted into the New Zealand Sports Hall of Fame.

National team head coaches
The following New Zealand netball internationals subsequently served as head coach of the national team.

Gold medalists

Netball World Cup

1967
The following New Zealand netball internationals were members of the squad that won the 1967 World Netball Championships. In 1996 they were also inducted into the New Zealand Sports Hall of Fame.

1979
The following New Zealand netball internationals were members of the New Zealand squad that shared the gold medal at the 1979 World Netball Championships with Australia and Trinidad and Tobago.

1987
The following New Zealand netball internationals were members of the squad that won the 1987 World Netball Championships. In 1996 they were also inducted into the New Zealand Sports Hall of Fame.

2003
The following New Zealand netball internationals were members of the squad that won the 2003 World Netball Championships.
At the 2003 Halberg Awards, the New Zealand national netball team won both the main award were named Team of the Year. Their head coach, Ruth Aitken, was named Coach of the Year and Irene van Dyk was named Sportswoman of the Year.

2019
The following New Zealand netball internationals were members of the squad that won the 2019 Netball World Cup.
At the 2019 Halberg Awards, the New Zealand national netball team won both the Halberg Award Supreme and were named Team of the Year. Winning the 2019 Netball World Cup was declared New Zealand's Favourite Sport Moment and their head coach, Noeline Taurua, was named Coach of the Year. The team was also awarded the 2019 Lonsdale Cup.

World Games

1985
The following New Zealand netball internationals were members of the squad that won the gold medal at the 1985 World Games.

1989
The following New Zealand netball internationals were members of the squad that won the gold medal at the 1989 World Games. At the 1989 Halberg Awards, the New Zealand national netball team was named Team of the Year and their head coach, Lyn Parker, was named Coach of the Year.

Commonwealth Games

2006
The following New Zealand netball internationals were members of the squad that won the gold medal at the 2006 Commonwealth Games.

2010
The following New Zealand netball internationals were members of the squad that won the gold medal at the 2010 Commonwealth Games. The team was also awarded the 2010 Lonsdale Cup.

Top 25 of the Last 25
In April 2022 to celebrate twenty five years of elite netball leagues in New Zealand, a panel of former coaches and players, selected the top twenty five players that, between 1998 and 2022, had played in the National Bank Cup, the ANZ Championship and the ANZ Premiership. All twenty five were New Zealand internationals.

New Zealand Netball Awards

Dame Lois Muir Supreme Award
The Dame Lois Muir Supreme Award recognises the best New Zealand netball internationals across all elite competitions and international campaigns. The award is named after Dame Lois Muir DNZM OBE. It is regarded as the highest individual accolade a New Zealand netballer can achieve. 

Notes
  Grace Nweke and Kelly Jury shared 2022 award.

Silver Ferns Player of the Year
The Silver Ferns Player of the Year is awarded to the New Zealand netball international player who has displayed consistent, outstanding performances throughout the international season.

Dual internationals

Netball
The following New Zealand netball internationals also represented other national teams in international netball.   

Notes
  Ameliaranne Ekenasio represented Australia at under-19 and under-21 levels.
  Kristiana Manu'a represented New Zealand at the 2022 Fast5 Netball World Series.
  Jamie-Lee Price represented New Zealand at secondary school level and under-21 levels and at the 2014 Fast5 Netball World Series.
  Rachel Rasmussen represented New Zealand at the 2010 World Netball Series.
  Courtney Tairi represented Australia at under-21 level.

Netball and Basketball
The following New Zealand netball internationals also played for the New Zealand women's national basketball team.

Family

Sisters

Mothers and daughters

References

 
Netball
New Zealand